Rancho La Providencia was a  Mexican land grant in present-day Los Angeles County, California given by governor Juan B. Alvarado in 1843 to Vincente de la Osa.  The majority of Rancho Providencia land north of the modern channel of the Los Angeles River is now part of Burbank.  The street grid change along Burbank Boulevard marks the northwestern boundary of the rancho grant.  The Walt Disney Studios, Warner Bros. Studios, NBC Studios Burbank, Providence High School, and Providence Saint Joseph Medical Center are all within the former boundaries of Rancho Providencia.  The Burbank Equestrian Center and portions of the Rancho south of the river are now part of the city of Los Angeles.

History

In 1834, Vicente de la Ossa (January 6, 1808 - 1861) was elected as Los Angeles councilman and served in this capacity for two years.  In 1843, he was granted the one square league Rancho Providencia located northwest of the pueblo. In 1849 de la Ossa sold Rancho La Providencia to David W. Alexander, and bought an approximate third of Rancho Los Encinos.

With the cession of California to the United States following the Mexican-American War, the 1848 Treaty of Guadalupe Hidalgo provided that the land grants would be honored.  As required by the Land Act of 1851, a claim for Rancho Providencia was filed with the Public Land Commission in 1852, and the grant was patented David W. Alexander and Francis Mellus in 1872.

In 1867, Alexander sold Rancho Providencia to David Burbank, a dentist and entrepreneur from Los Angeles. Burbank had also acquired Rancho Cahuenga, a  inholding within the boundaries of Rancho Providencia.  Burbank also purchased  of Rancho San Rafael from Jonathan R. Scott in 1867.  Burbank combined his properties into a nearly  cattle ranch.

Burbank sold his holdings in 1886 to Los Angeles land speculators who formed the "Providencia Land, Water & Development Company", with Burbank as one of the directors. The land was surveyed and a business district was laid out, surrounded by residential lots. The outlying area was divided into small farms.  They named the town Burbank and opened the tract for sale on May 1, 1887.  The City of Burbank was incorporated in 1911.

See also
Battle of Providencia
Providencia Ranch
History of the San Fernando Valley to 1915
Ranchos of California
List of Ranchos of California
 David W. Alexander, 19th century Los Angeles, California, politician and sheriff

References

External links
Map of old Spanish and Mexican ranchos in Los Angeles County

Providencia
Providencia
History of the San Fernando Valley
History of Los Angeles
Providencia
Burbank, California
Toluca Lake, Los Angeles